Annamoe is a village located on the Avonmore river in County Wicklow, Ireland about  south of Dublin. It is on the R755 road (at the junction with the R763) between Roundwood and Laragh on the road to Glendalough.

The small stone humpback bridge is a common place for tourists to stop and view the County Wicklow scenery. There is a trout fishery in the village with a  lake where one can fly or bait fish. A separate fishing pond for children allows them to catch brown and rainbow trout.

Annamoe and the surrounding countryside is a breeding stronghold of the great spotted woodpecker, Ireland's newest species.

Castle Kevin, close to Annamoe, of which a few ruins survive, was a medieval fort which formed an important part of Dublin city's defences against raids by the O'Toole clan. The constable was an important Crown official.

Notable residents
 John Boorman, film director.
 Erskine Childers, former Irish president (buried at Derrylossery Church).
 Daniel Day-Lewis, actor.
 Paul McGuinness, manager of rock band U2.
 Paddy Moloney, founder and leader of traditional Irish band The Chieftains.
 John Millington Synge, writer.
 Paolo Tullio, chef.

Gallery

See also
 List of towns and villages in Ireland

References

Further reading

Towns and villages in County Wicklow